Fukahori is a Japanese surname. Notable people with the surname include:

, Japanese Roman Catholic bishop
, Japanese footballer
, Japanese Barista

Japanese-language surnames